Georgia Ellen Plimmer (born 8 February 2004) is a New Zealand cricketer who currently plays for Wellington Blaze as a right-handed batter. In February 2022, she was named in New Zealand's squad for 2022 Women's Cricket World Cup as a replacement for injured Lauren Down. In May 2022, she was named in New Zealand Women's central contract list for the 2022–23 season.

Plimmer made her List A debut for Wellington in the 2019–20 Hallyburton Johnstone Shield. She made her T20 debut for Wellington in the 2020–21 Super Smash.

In June 2022, Plimmer was named in New Zealand's team for the cricket tournament at the 2022 Commonwealth Games in Birmingham, England. Plimmer made her Women's Twenty20 International (WT20I) debut for New Zealand against Australia on 6 August 2022 at the Commonwealth Games. She made her One Day International debut against the West Indies on 25 September 2022.

In December 2022, Plimmer was selected in the New Zealand Under-19 squad for the 2023 ICC Under-19 Women's T20 World Cup. She was New Zealand's leading run-scorer in the tournament, with 155 runs at an average of 51.66. In January 2023, Plimmer was selected in New Zealand's squad for the 2023 ICC Women's T20 World Cup, in which she made three appearances.

References

External links
 
 

2004 births
Living people
New Zealand women cricketers
New Zealand women One Day International cricketers
New Zealand women Twenty20 International cricketers
Wellington Blaze cricketers
Cricketers at the 2022 Commonwealth Games
Commonwealth Games bronze medallists for New Zealand
Commonwealth Games medallists in cricket
Medallists at the 2022 Commonwealth Games